Terror of the Stratus, known in Japan as  is an action video game developed by Nude Maker and published by Konami for the PlayStation Portable. It was released in Japan on October 27, 2011.

Gameplay
The game has two different main gameplay modes. In "extermination mode", the game plays much like a 3D third-person shooter, while in "defense mode", the game plays like a 2D sidescroller.

Development
The game was first announced by Konami in May 2011. It was announced to be made by developer Nude Maker, who had previously developed Infinite Space with PlatinumGames, and Steel Battalion prior to that.

On October 20, 2011, a demo of the game was released on the Japanese PlayStation Network, allowing the first chapter of the game to be played.

The game was released digitally on the PlayStation Network, and physically at retail. The retail version exclusively came with a sixteen-page artbook by character designer Katsumi Enami.

Reception and sales
The game charted as the ninth best-selling game during it first week of release, selling 15,623 copies.

Notes

References

External links
 

2011 video games
Action video games
Japan-exclusive video games
Konami games
Nude Maker games
PlayStation Portable games
PlayStation Portable-only games
Single-player video games
Video games developed in Japan